Oxford is a city in Oxfordshire, England.

Oxford may also refer to:

Places

England

 Oxford (UK Parliament constituency), the historic Parliamentary constituency of the city
 Oxford Canal, a canal from Coventry to Oxford, England
 Oxford Castle, England
 Oxford East (UK Parliament constituency), a modern Parliamentary constituency of the city
 Oxford West and Abingdon (UK Parliament constituency), the other modern constituency including the city
 Oxford, Staffordshire, a location in Staffordshire

Australia 

 Oxford, Queensland, a locality in the Isaac Region
 Oxford Falls, New South Wales, a suburb of Sydney

Canada
 Oxford, Edmonton, a neighbourhood in Edmonton, Alberta
 Oxford, Nova Scotia, in Cumberland County
 Oxford County, Ontario
 Oxford (electoral district)
 Mount Oxford (Nunavut), a mountain on Ellesmere Island

New Zealand 

Oxford, New Zealand, an urban area in Canterbury

United States
 Oxford, Alabama
 Oxford, Arkansas
 Oxford, Colorado
 Oxford, Connecticut
 Oxford, Florida
 Oxford, Georgia
 Oxford, Idaho
 Oxford, Indiana 
 Oxford, Iowa
 Oxford, Kansas  
 Oxford, Kentucky
 Oxford, Maine
 Oxford (CDP), Maine
 Oxford, Maryland  
 Oxford, Massachusetts 
 Oxford (CDP), Massachusetts
 Oxford, Michigan
 Oxford, Mississippi
 Oxford, Nebraska
 Oxford Township, New Jersey
 Oxford CDP, New Jersey
 Oxford (town), New York 
 Oxford (village), New York 
 Oxford, North Carolina
 Oxford, Ohio
 Oxford, Pennsylvania
 Oxford, West Virginia
 Oxford (town), Wisconsin
 Oxford, Wisconsin
 Oxford, United States Virgin Islands
 Oxford Junction, Iowa
 New Oxford, Pennsylvania
 North Oxford, Maine
 South Oxford, Maine
 Oxford Basin, California

Other places
Oxford County (disambiguation)
 Oxford Township (disambiguation)

People
 Oxford (surname), a surname (and a list of people with the name)
 Bishop of Oxford
 Earl of Oxford, a title in the English peerage
 Edward de Vere, 17th Earl of Oxford (1550–1604), candidate for authorship of the Shakespeare oeuvre (Oxfordian theory)

Art, entertainment and media
 Oxford Bach Choir
 Oxford English Dictionary
 Oxford, U.S.A.

Brands and enterprises
 Oxford (company), a producer of office products
 Oxford (toy company), a South Korean toy company
 Oxford Bus Company, a bus transport company
 Oxford Diffraction, a British company specializing in X-ray diffraction equipment, now part of Varian, Inc.
 Oxford Health Plans, medical insurance
 Oxford Instruments, a scientific company
 Oxford Playhouse, a theatre in Oxford, England
 Oxford Properties Group, a Canadian property management company
 Oxford Records, a record label
 Oxford University Press, a university press

Clothing
 Oxford (cloth), a type of cotton cloth, typically used for shirts
 Oxford shirt, a shirt made of Oxford cloth
 Oxford shoe, a style of shoe

Educational institutions
 Oxford Academy (California), US
 Oxford Brookes University, Oxford, England
 Oxford College of Emory University, US
 University of Oxford, Oxford, England

Flora and fauna
 Oxford, a red variety of Darwin tulip
 Golden Oxford, a yellow variety of Darwin tulip
 Oxford Ragwort, (Senecio squalidus) a plant
 Oxford sheep, or Oxford Down, a breed of sheep originating in England

Language
 Oxford comma, the serial comma
 Oxford English, a formal style of English
 Oxford "-er", a type of slang

Religion
 Oxford Group, a 20th-century religious movement which became Moral Re-Armament
 Oxford Movement, 19th century Anglo-Catholic theological movement

Sport
 Oxford Blue, a sporting award
 Oxford City F.C., an English Conference North football club
 Oxford F.C., a 19th-century football club in Glasgow, Scotland
 Oxford Plains Speedway, a race track in Oxford, Maine
 Oxford Rugby League, a rugby league club in Oxford, England
 Oxford United F.C., an English League One football club
 Oxford United Stars F.C., a football club in Northern Ireland

Transport
 Manchester Oxford Road railway station, a railway station in Manchester, England
 Oxford Airport, England
 Oxford / City of Sheridan (RTD), a transit station in Sheridan, Colorado, USA
 Oxford railway station, England
 Oxford Rewley Road railway station, a former railway station in Oxford, England
 Oxford Road Halt railway station, a former railway station near Oxford, England
 Oxford services, a motorway service station near Oxford, England
 Oxford station (Ohio), a proposed Amtrak station in Oxford, Ohio, USA
 Oxford Tube, an express coach service between Oxford and London

Vehicles
 Airspeed Oxford, World War II–era twin-engine trainer aircraft
 HMS Oxford, two ships of the Royal Navy
 Morris Oxford, a car
 Nuffield Oxford Taxi, or Wolseley Oxford Taxi, a taxicab
 SS City of Oxford, merchant ship sunk in the Second World War

Other uses
 Oxford Archaeology, an archaeological unit of sedimentary rock
 Oxford Clay, a type of sedimentary rock
 Oxford Round Table, a series of interdisciplinary conferences
Oxford University vaccine, a COVID-19 vaccine also known as AZD1222 or ChAdOx1 nCoV-19

See also
 Ox Ford, an action during the Battle of North Anna in the American Civil War